Leigh Kennedy (born June 4, 1951, in Denver, Colorado) is an American science fiction writer who has lived in the United Kingdom since 1985.

Kennedy's story "Her Furry Face" was a nominee for the Nebula Award for Best Short Story.

She was married from 1988 until 2011 to writer Christopher Priest, with whom she has twins.

Works

Novels
The Journal of Nicholas the American (1986)
Saint Hiroshima (1987)

Collections
Faces (1986)
Wind Angels (2011)

References
 The Encyclopedia of Science Fiction, p. 662

External links
Sci-Fiction bio

 

20th-century American novelists
American science fiction writers
American women short story writers
American women novelists
1951 births
Living people
Writers from Denver 
Writers from Austin, Texas 
Women science fiction and fantasy writers
20th-century American women writers
20th-century American short story writers
Novelists from Texas
Novelists from Colorado
21st-century American women